Events from the year 1863 in Denmark.

Incumbents
 Monarch – Frederick VII (until 15 November), Christian IX
 Prime minister – Carl Christian Hall (until 31 December), Ditlev Gothard Monrad

Events

 
 6 June  Frederick VII receives a Freek deputation at Christiansborg.
 22 October – The first tramway in Copenhagen begins operations. The Horse-drawn tram cars run along a single track between Sankt Annæ Plads and Frederiksberg Runddel.
 15 November – With Christian IX's accent to the Danuish throne, the House of Glücksburg succeeded the House of Oldenburg.
 Christian IX signs the so-called November Constitution establishing a shared law of succession and a common parliament for both Schleswig and Denmark. This is seen by the German Confederation as a violation of the 1852 London Protocol.
 24 December – Saxon and Hanoverian troops marched into Holstein on behalf of the Confederation. Supported by the German soldiers and by loyal Holsteiners, Frederick VIII, Duke of Schleswig-Holstein took control of the government of Holstein.

Births
 25 April – Carl Wentorf, painter (died 1914)
 21 June – Anne Marie Carl-Nielsen, sculptor (died 1945)
 25 June – Frederik Jensen, stage and film actor (died 1934)
 5 July  Anton Carl Illum, businessman (died 1938)
 7 September – Jens Ferdinand Willumsen, painter (died 1958)
 11 October – Ingeborg Raunkiær, author (died 1921)

Deaths
 17 June – Ferdinand, Hereditary Prince of Denmark (born 1792)
 15 November – Frederick VII, king of Denmark (born 1808)

References

 
1860s in Denmark
Denmark
Years of the 19th century in Denmark